"Manchmal haben Frauen..." ("Sometimes, women have...") is a song by German rock band Die Ärzte. It is the eleventh track and the second single from their 2000 album Runter mit den Spendierhosen, Unsichtbarer!.

The song is about a man who meets a drunk man in a bar who tells him something that's unbelievable for him—sometimes women like a little spanking. The man rushes home and asks his girlfriend about this. The woman starts to beat the man stating that guys like him always deserve some beating.

Music video 

The band members are judges at a female bodybuilder show. After the show, Bela goes home with a bodybuilder. They jump in the bed and she starts to beat Bela.

Track listing 

 "Manchmal haben Frauen..." – 4:10
 "Rettet die Wale" – 1:48
 "Matthäus 1:5:0" – 1:01
 "Methan" – 2:16

B-sides 

 "Rettet die Wale" ("Save the whales") is a call to save the whales. A Japanese language version was released on the Japanese compilation "Poptastic Conversation", titled "Kujira o sukue". It's unknown if this selection was intentional, but it fits well, because in Japan, whaling is legal.
 "Matthäus 1:5:0" is about football player Lothar Matthäus, the title a pun on the German name for Matthew the Evangelist, the citation form for Bible passages and football scores.
 "Methan" ("Methane") is about people who are always looking for a fight.

Personnel
Bela B. – vocals
Farin Urlaub – guitar
Rodrigo González – bass

Charts

References

2000 singles
Die Ärzte songs
Songs written by Bela B.
2000 songs